Joseph Francis Enright (September 18, 1910 – July 20, 2000) was a submarine captain in the United States Navy.  He is best known as the man who sank the Japanese aircraft carrier Shinano–the "most significant single submarine sinking of World War II."

US Navy career 
Enright was born in Minot, North Dakota.

Enright assumed command of the newly built USS Dace on July 23, 1943, and in October sailed out on her first war patrol into busy Japanese waters. On November 15 an Ultra message alerted him to intercept aircraft carrier Shōkaku; Enright located the target and "made a timid approach, abandoning the effort as daylight approached". He then found another target, a tanker, but was depth charged by escort ships and withdrew from active pursuit. In the end the 49-day patrol brought no results. Enright took the blame for failure: "I was responsible for an unproductive patrol and request to be relieved by an officer who can perform more satisfactorily". Admiral Lockwood granted the request and demoted Enright to administrative duties ashore.

Archerfish left Pearl Harbor on October 30, 1944, and reached Saipan on November 9. For the next two weeks the submarine provided search and rescue support to American aviators in the areas of planned air strikes. Visual contact became possible at 2140, and by 2300 Enright identified it as an aircraft carrier protected by three destroyers. 

Enright had initially assumed the target was a tanker. Once he realized it was a carrier, he ordered it tracked "from ahead" in hopes that he could get ahead and attack from below.

At 0241, on November 29, the target turned away from Archerfish and then straight at her. At 0305, Enright ordered Archerfish to dive. At 0317 at a mere  from the target, Enright fired all six available torpedoes at the carrier. He deliberately set the torpedoes to run shallow; he not only wanted to ensure a hit in case they ran deeper than set, but also hoped to increase the likelihood of capsizing the carrier by holing it further up on its hull. While rigged for silent running, Enright and his crew heard loud breaking-up noises for 47 minutes, and were certain they had sent their quarry to the bottom. It was only after the war that the carrier was identified as Shinano, the long-rumored third battleship of the Yamato class. Her keel had been converted into a supercarrier while still under construction. Four of his sub's torpedoes had found their mark. Due to crew inexperience and design flaws, she struggled with damage for more than seven hours and finally capsized at 10:57. The damage was magnified because Shinanos commander, Captain , had inadvertently exposed his ship's entire side to Archerfish in his haste to escape, creating an ideal firing situation for a submarine. With a full-load displacement of 72,000 tons, Shinano is the largest warship in history to be sunk by a submarine. The action earned Enright his Navy Cross.

On September 2, 1945, Enright and his crew, along with eleven other submarines, were honored with the task of protecting  during the signing of the Japanese Instrument of Surrender.

Retirement years 
After retirement in 1963 Enright worked at Northrop on the OMEGA Navigation System.

He died in Fairfax, Virginia, and is buried at Arlington National Cemetery.

Awards and decorations

Notes

References

External links 

 USS Archerfish tribute site

1910 births
2000 deaths
United States Navy personnel of World War II
United States Naval Academy alumni
United States submarine commanders
Recipients of the Navy Cross (United States)
Recipients of the Legion of Merit
People from Minot, North Dakota
Burials at Arlington National Cemetery